HMS Artois was a fifth-rate  frigate of the Royal Navy, designed by Sir John Henslow and launched in 1794 at Rotherhithe as the lead ship of her class. She served for the majority of her career in the English Channel under the command of Edmund Nagle in the squadrons of Edward Pellew and John Borlase Warren, notably taking part in the action of 21 October 1794 where she captured the 44-gun frigate La Révolutionnaire almost singlehandedly. She participated in a number of  other actions and events including the attempted invasion of France in 1795. Artois continued to serve actively on the coast of France in blockade and patrolling roles, taking a large number of ships as prizes, until she was wrecked with no loss of life off Île de Ré on 31 July 1797 while attempting to reconnoitre the harbour of La Rochelle.

Construction
Artois was a 38-gun, 18-pounder, fifth-rate Artois-class frigate designed by Sir John Henslow. She and her class were ordered soon after the start of the French Revolutionary War to provide an influx of modern warships for the Royal Navy. Artois was the name-ship of her class and the first to be laid down; of the nine ships of the class seven, including Artois, were built of oak while the final two were built of fir. Artois was an improvement on the 18-pounder frigates of the American Revolutionary War which were found to be too small and that their battery placement made them unstable at sea. To counter this, Artois and her contemporaries built in the 1790s were lengthened forwards to make them faster and more stable. The extra space provided by this expansion made the ships faster but did not stop the issue of violent pitching, which would not be fixed until HMS Active was launched as an improvement to the Artois-class in 1799. Despite this, the class would go on to gain a reputation as 'crack frigates'. They were perfect for their assigned role as frigates on blockade duties, being large enough to fight any French frigate sent to attack them while on station but also fast enough and weatherly enough to be able to stay at their posts no matter the weather type.

She measured 996 tons burthen. The fitting out process for Artois was completed at Deptford on 30 March. In January 1794 Captain Lord Charles Fitzgerald of Artois requested to the Admiralty that a bridle port, a square porthole in the bow that a gun could be placed in, be fitted to assist in chasing ships, however it was deemed unfeasible to fit one on a ship designed without it. On 19 November eight 32-pound carronades were added to the Artois-class ships by Admiralty Order, leading some to describe them as 44-gun frigates in the future. On 20 June 1796 another Admiralty Order saw the ship's crew complement increase from 270 to 284.

Service

1794
Artois was commissioned under Captain Lord Charles Fitzgerald in December 1793 to serve on the Cork Station. After this Captain Edmund Nagle took command of Artois, but was absent at the beginning of her service, with two temporary captains standing in for him. In April 1794 Artois served at the siege of Bastia under the command of Captain Thomas Byam Martin, where the ships of Admiral Lord Hood's Mediterranean Fleet starved the French garrison out of Bastia. Artois then moved to the English Channel where she was to serve in the Brest blockade squadron of Commodore John Borlase Warren; for a brief period of time she was then commanded by Commander George Byng before Nagle returned to take command of Artois. She would spend the majority of her career stationed with the squadron in and around Audierne Bay.

Le Volontaire

On 23 August Artois took part in the destruction of the 36-gun frigate Le Volontaire on the Penmarks. The frigate was discovered early in the morning by Warren's squadron comprising Artois and the frigates HMS Arethusa, HMS Diamond, HMS Flora, HMS Diana, and HMS Santa Margarita. The British ships had left Falmouth on 7 August with the intent of hunting a squadron of French frigates known to be around the Isles of Scilly, but found Le Volontaire off Brittany instead. Le Volontaire was forced by the squadron to anchor off the coast to avoid wrecking, and the British ships attacked her to such a degree that she was forced to cut her cables in an attempt to change her positioning. In doing so La Volontaire was driven ashore and after her pumps failed to remove the incoming water her crew abandoned her. The frigate was unrecoverable and stayed there in its disabled state. The same British ships then discovered the 12-gun brig L'Alerte and 18-gun corvette Espion in the nearby Audierne Bay. The two French ships ran themselves aground under the cover of three batteries of guns. They were then boarded by boats from the squadron and fifty-two prisoners were brought off them; the ships also had a large number of men with injuries that made them unmovable, which meant that the British were not able to destroy the ships, instead leaving them and the wounded where they had grounded. The following night the French succeeded in rescuing Espion, but L'Alerte was lost. On 26 August the ships Queen and Donna Maria were recaptured by the squadron in the same area. The squadron continued its patrols, taking the cutter La Quartidi on 7 September and recapturing the Swedish brig Haesingeland on 16 September.

La Révolutionnaire 

By October Artois was serving in the squadron of Edward Pellew. On 21 October the squadron, comprising Artois, Arethusa, Diamond, and the frigate HMS Galatea, encountered the French 44-gun frigate La Révolutionnaire  sailing off Ushant. The squadron chased La Révolutionnaire which looked to avoid the force, but the superior sailing qualities of Artois allowed her to sail ahead of the rest of the squadron and come up with La Révolutionnaire before she could escape. The squadron then cut La Révolutionnaire off from the coast which she might have sailed towards for assistance, forcing the French frigate to engage Artois. The two frigates fought an engagement of forty minutes in which eight Frenchmen and three Britons were killed, including the lieutenant of marines. Diamond approached the action next and came up behind La Révolutionnaire, threatening to fire into her stern. La Révolutionnaire surrendered to Artois upon the approach of the rest of Pellew's squadron, as the frigate had been launched only a few weeks previously; the raw crew refused to continue fighting and forced the captain to surrender. Pellew reported that the intervention of the rest of the squadron had been unnecessary, and that Artois would have succeeded even if she had been completely unsupported. The French frigate was bought into the navy as HMS Révolutionnaire; Captain Nagle was knighted for his conduct against her and his first lieutenant, Robert Dudley Oliver, was promoted to commander.

1795

After this Artois returned to the command of Commodore Warren and his squadron. On 18 February 1795 the squadron of Artois, Galatea, Arethusa, and Warren's frigate HMS Pomone encountered a French convoy of twenty ships protected by the frigate Néréide off Oléron. The squadron pursued the convoy up the Pertuis d'Antioche towards Île-d'Aix; while the tide forced the British to halt the attack before they reached Aix, they  captured one ship, three brigs, two luggers, one sloop, and an 8-gun schooner. As well as this ten brigs and a lugger were destroyed; the convoy had been carrying food and clothing for the French military. The squadron was very busy in February and March, and including those taken on 18 February the squadron took the ships Le Pierre, Le Petit Jean, Le Deux Freres, La Liberte, Le Adelaide, L'Aimable, La Coureause, L'Aimable Madelaine, La Pacquebot de Cayenne, and La Biche between 13 February and 2 March. A strange sail was sighted on 15 April by the squadron, and the signal to give chase given; Artois caught her first, proving it to be the 26-gun corvette Le Jean Bart. On 16 April Artois and Galatea similarly took the 16-gun sloop Expedition, which had previously been a British packet ship, and the ship Maria Francis Fidilla off Rochefort, and Artois on her own captured two sloops with cargoes of fish.

Between June and October she participated in the failed French émigré invasion of France at Quiberon. As such Artois was present in the fleet at the Battle of Groix on 23 June, where she shared in the capture of the three French ships-of-the-line Alexander, Formidable, and Tigre, despite not participating directly in the action that occurred when the British and French fleets came upon one another while on separate missions. The British fleet under Lord Bridport had been convoying the invasion force to France, and Artois was part of a force of three ships-of-the-line and six frigates under Warren guarding the fifty-ship convoy conveying the Comte de Puisaye's émigré force of 2,500 men. The troops were successfully landed on 27 June and Warren's squadron went on to occupy Île d'Yeu, but after a series of reversals against French revolutionary soldiers the entire force was evacuated to England, with Artois and the other ships providing covering fire to the escaping Royalists.

1796

After the failure of this enterprise, Artois returned to her usual duties of blockade and patrols; on 6 March 1796 the ship Sultana was captured, and a day later Nancy also. On 20 March she was sailing with the frigates HMS Anson, Pomone, and Galatea off Pointe du Raz when they discovered a French convoy of seventy ships. The convoy was guarded by the frigates Prosperine, Unite, Coquille, and Tamise, and the corvette Cigogne. Artois and Pomone quickly took four of the convoy ships; one ship and three brigs. These were Illier, Don de Dieu, Paul Edward, and Felicite. The convoy turned away from the squadron, and as the British ships drew closer the French brought their warships together and passed the British in line as they went in the other direction, exchanging fire and heavily damaging Galatea. The British then began a concerted effort to follow the convoy and break through its ranks in a line of battle as it fled towards Brest but failed to bring it to action again, only taking the 28-gun armed store ship Etoile which had been at the rear of the convoy. The four French frigates and the corvette all escaped under the cover of night, while the majority of the convoy took shelter under the protection of some coastal gun batteries. Commodore Warren in Pomone was criticised for not doing more to press his advantage against the convoy, in all taking only six of the ships. The squadron took the ships La Marie, L'Union, La Bonne, and a brig between 7 and 13 April. Finding continued success, Artois took Pacific on 14 May, Lodoiska on 22 May, and Fantasie on 25 May, and the chasse-marées Charlotte and Veronique on 16 August.

Andromaque

On 22 August Artois was in company with the same squadron of ships and the brig-sloop HMS Sylph off the mouth of the river Gironde, when the French frigate Andromaque came into sight attempting to enter the river. Andromaque had been cruising in a squadron with two other frigates and a corvette, but had left their company after springing a leak. Galatea was closest to the enemy and began a chase of it, followed by Pomone and Anson, while Artois and Sylph were sent to investigate the appearance of two other strange sails. The chase continued through the night, and by 4 a.m. on 23 August Galatea and Andromaque were only one mile offshore. At day break Artois and Sylph came into sight, having ascertained that the strange sails were neutral American merchants, and at 5:30 a.m. Andromaque attempted to make her escape from the squadron, but at 6 a.m. she ran herself aground close to Arcachon, losing all her masts. Artois, Galatea, and Sylph sent their boats in to take control of the unresisting frigate; before they reached it many of the ship's crew jumped into the rough seas rather than be captured, while the rest were able to walk from the stranded frigate to the coast once the tide had gone out. In the evening of 23 August boats from Sylph set fire to Andromaque which then exploded.

On 2 November Artois and Warren's squadron were in company with the fleet of Lord Bridport when she took the 12-gun privateer Le Franklin off Ushant after a chase alongside the frigate HMS Thalia. In December Artois began a string of successes, taking  a brig and the chasse-marées Le Providence and La Maria Theresa on 11 December, a Spanish brig on 14 December, and another Spanish brig Divina Pastora on 17 December.

1797

The activity of Artois'''s squadron continued into 1797, taking Le Jean Amie on 15 February, Nordzee on 16 March, and recapturing the whaler Mary on 25 April. On 16 July a French convoy of fourteen ships guarded by the frigate La Calliope and two corvettes was discovered and chased by Warren's squadron, comprising the same ships as last noted and the cutter Dolly.James, Naval History vol. 2, p. 95 The corvettes succeeded in escaping into Audierne Bay, but La Calliope was unable to run from the squadron and was made to engage it. In order to escape destruction La Calliope cut away her masts and ran herself aground on the Penmarks early in the morning of 17 July. To stop the French from removing the stores from La Calliope, Anson and Sylph bombarded the stranded ship while Artois and Pomone watched from further out to sea. La Calliope broke up on the rocks on 18 July.

Fate
On 31 July 1797 Artois was wrecked on a sandbank near the Ballieu rocks on the north-west coast of Île de Ré. She had been attempting to reconnoitre the harbour of La Rochelle; the entire crew was saved by Sylph. The pilot and master of Artois were condemned for their negligence in causing the wreck.

Prizes

Notes and citations
Notes

Citations

References

 Brenton, Edward Pelham (1837) The Naval History of Great Britain, From the Year MDCCLXXXIII, to MDCCCXXXVI Volume 1. London: Henry Colburn.
 Chamberlain, Paul (2018) The Napoleonic Prison of Norman Cross: The Lost Town of Huntingdonshire. Stroud: The History Press. 
 Clarke, James Stanier and John McArthur (1800) The Naval Chronicle: Containing a General and Biographical History of the Royal Navy of the United Kingdom with a Variety of Original Papers on Nautical Subjects Volume 3: January–July 1800. Cambridge: Cambridge University Press. 
 Clowes, William Laird (1899) The Royal Navy: A History from the Earliest Times to 1900 Volume Four. London: Sampson Low, Marston and Company. 
 Duncan, Archibald (1805) The British Trident; or, Register of Naval Actions; including Authentic Accounts of all the most Remarkable Engagements at Sea, in which The British Flag has been Eminently Distinguished; from the period of the memorable Defeat of the Spanish Armada, to the Present Time. Volume III. London: James Cundee.
 Gardiner, Robert (1994) The Heavy Frigate: Eighteen-Pounder Frigates: Vol I, 1778-1800. London: Conway Maritime Press. 
 Gossett, William Patrick (1986) The Lost Ships of the Royal Navy, 1793-1900. London: Mansell Publishing. 
 Heathcote, T.A. (2002) The British Admirals of the Fleet 1734-1995. Barnsley: Pen & Sword. 
 Henderson, James (1970) The Frigates. London:  A & C Black. 
 James, William (1859) The Naval History of Great Britain, Volume 1. Cambridge: Cambridge University Press. 
 James, William (1859) The Naval History of Great Britain, Volume 2. Cambridge: Cambridge University Press. 
 La Barre, A. (1825) The French Coasting Pilot; being a Description of Every Harbour, Roadstead, Channel, Cove, and River on the French Coast in the English Channel, and in the Bay of Biscay, from Treport to St. Jean de Luz, with the Setting of the Tides at Each Place: To which are added Correct Tables of High and Low Water for Every Day in the Year. Plymouth: J. Williams.
 
 Marshall, John (1823) Royal Naval Biography: or, Memoirs of the Services of all the Flag-Officers, Superannuated Rear-Admirals, Retired-Captains, Post-Captains, and Commanders Volume 1 - Part 1. Cambridge: Cambridge University Press. 
 Marshall, John (1823) Royal Naval Biography: or, Memoirs of the Services of all the Flag-Officers, Superannuated Rear-Admirals, Retired-Captains, Post-Captains, and Commanders Volume 1 - Part 2. Cambridge: Cambridge University Press. 
 
 Urban, Sylvanus (1830) The Gentleman's Magazine, and Historical Chronicle. From January to June 1830. Volume C. Part the First. London: J. B. Nichols and Son.
 Wareham, Thomas Nigel Ralph (1999) The Frigate Captains of the Royal Navy, 1793-1815.'' Unpublished doctoral thesis, University of Exeter.

External links
 
 Ships of the Old Navy

1794 ships
Ships built in Rotherhithe
Fifth-rate frigates of the Royal Navy
Maritime incidents in 1797
Artois-class frigates